Gertrude Bugler (1897 – 1992) was a British stage actress of the Edwardian Era best known for acting in plays adapted by Thomas Hardy.

Biography
Gertrude Bugler was born in 1897 in Dorchester, Dorset (the hometown of Thomas Hardy). Gertrude was the daughter of Augusta, a local milkmaid who had attracted the attention of the young Thomas Hardy, who was not yet a writer. Hardy was too shy to approach Augusta but had used her as the model for the heroine in his novel Tess of the d'Urbervilles in 1890. Hardy then moved to London to pursue his successful writing career and did not see her again until he returned to Dorchester in 1913. Hardy, then age 72, had returned to his old home to work on dramatizations of his novels.

By this time, Augusta had been married and was running a hotel where Hardy set up house and used as a headquarters for his theatrical troupe called The Hardy Players, made up of local amateur actors. Augusta's daughter, Gertrude Bugler, then 16, was an aspiring actress who joined the troupe. Hardy was quickly smitten with the beautiful young girl who reportedly bore a strong resemblance to her mother, and he cast her in a role in The Woodlanders. The play was staged locally but drama critics who came from London to preview the play gave Bugler glowing reviews for her angelic beauty and her naturalistic style of acting. Returning in 1921, Hardy cast her in a lead role in Return of the Native to more rave reviews. In 1924, he adapted Tess of the d'Urbervilles and again cast Bugler with similar rave results. Hardy made plans to take the play to London with Bugler as the lead role.

Hardy's wife Florence Dugdale had been jealous of Hardy's affection for Bugler even though he was at that point 83 years old and Bugler was 26 and married. Dugdale forbade the bringing of the Buglers to the London production, much to the disappointment of Hardy and those critics who had seen Bugler play the role. After Hardy's death in 1928, Dugdale, feeling some guilt over preventing Bugler from a chance at performing on the London stage, gave her the role of Tess in a 1929 London production at The Duke of York's Theatre which garnered the expected lavish praise for her sensitive performance and natural charm. However, The London Stage 1920-1929: A Calendar of Productions, Performers, and Personnel states that the reviews were decidedly mixed. After enjoying her moment in the sun, Bugler, now married with a daughter and an ailing mother (who later died in 1940) and a younger sister Norrie, quit on acting and returned to Dorchester where she lived quietly and happily, living to the age of 95. Bugler later wrote about her experiences in Personal Recollections of Thomas Hardy, published by The Dorset Natural History and Archaeological Society in 1962.

Her younger sister Norrie Woodhall (another aspiring actress who also stayed in Dorchester) was still alive in 2008 and for her 100th birthday staged a production of Tess for the internet. Norrie Woodhall died in 2011 at the age of 105 as the last member of the Hardy Players.

References

Bibliography
"Personal recollections of Thomas Hardy", (Gertrude Bugler, The Dorset Natural History and Archaeological Society, 1962)
"The Life of Thomas Hardy: A Critical Biography", (Paul Turner, 2001)
"Thomas Hardy: A Biography Revisited", (Michael Millgate, Oxford University Press, 2004)
"Thomas Hardy: The Guarded Life", (Ralph Pite, York University Press)
"Thomas Hardy: The Time-torn Man", (Claire Tomalin, 2002)
"The Pessimism of Thomas Hardy", (G. W. Sherman)
"The London Stage 1920-1929: A Calendar of Productions, Performers, and Personnel", (J. P. Wearing, Rowman & Littlefield).

External links
Independent.co.uk
Articles.latimes.com - An obituary
Telegraph.co.uk
Nationaltrustcollections.org - includes photo of Gertrude as Tess

British stage actresses
1992 deaths
1897 births